Quenton Meeks (born June 20, 1997) is an American football cornerback who is a free agent. He played college football at Stanford.

Early years
Meeks attended Del Norte High School in San Diego, California. He committed to Stanford University to play college football.

College career
Meeks played at Stanford from 2015 to 2017. After his junior season in 2017, he decided to forgo his senior year and enter the 2018 NFL Draft. During his career he had 115 tackles, seven interceptions and two touchdowns.

Professional career

Jacksonville Jaguars
Meeks signed with the Jacksonville Jaguars as an undrafted free agent on April 30, 2018. He was waived on September 1, 2018 and was signed to the practice squad the next day. He was promoted to the active roster on October 6, 2018.

On August 31, 2019, Meeks was waived by the Jaguars.

Los Angeles Chargers
On October 1, 2019, Meeks was signed to the Los Angeles Chargers practice squad. He signed a futures contract with the Chargers on December 30, 2019. He was placed on the active/non-football illness list to start training camp on August 3, 2020, and was activated from the list the next day. He was waived on September 5, 2020 and signed to the practice squad the next day. He was elevated to the active roster on November 7 and November 14 for the team's weeks 9 and 10 games against the Las Vegas Raiders and Miami Dolphins, and reverted to the practice squad after each game. He was released on November 26, 2020.

Jacksonville Jaguars (second stint)
On December 7, 2020, Meeks signed with the practice squad of the Jacksonville Jaguars. He was elevated to the active roster on December 12 and December 19 for the team's weeks 14 and 15 game against the Tennessee Titans and Baltimore Ravens, and reverted to the practice squad after each game. On December 26, 2020, Meeks was promoted to the active roster. He was waived on March 17, 2021.

Tennessee Titans
Meeks signed with the Tennessee Titans on May 11, 2021. He was waived on July 31, 2021.

Tampa Bay Bandits
On March 10, 2022, Meeks was drafted in the USFL supplemental draft by the Tampa Bay Bandits.

New Orleans Saints
On August 6, 2022, Meeks signed with the New Orleans Saints. He was waived on August 28.

St. Louis BattleHawks 
On November 17, 2022, Meeks was drafted by the St. Louis BattleHawks of the XFL.

Personal life
His father is longtime NFL coach Ron Meeks, who grew up in Jacksonville. Ron attended Robert E. Lee High School.

References

External links
Jacksonville Jaguars bio
Stanford Cardinal bio

Living people
1997 births
American football cornerbacks
Jacksonville Jaguars players
Los Angeles Chargers players
New Orleans Saints players
Players of American football from San Diego
Stanford Cardinal football players
St. Louis BattleHawks players
Tampa Bay Bandits (2022) players
Tennessee Titans players